The Northern Cape Department of Economic Development and Tourism is the department of the Government of the Northern Cape responsible for economic development and economic planning as well as promoting and developing tourism within the Northern Cape province of South Africa. The MEC of the department is Abraham Vosloo.

References

External links
 Official website

Government of the Northern Cape
Northern Cape
Northern Cape
Tourism ministries